Schefflera capitulifera is a species of plant in the family Araliaceae. It is endemic to Sumatra.

References

capitulifera
Endemic flora of Sumatra
Trees of Sumatra
Vulnerable plants
Taxonomy articles created by Polbot
Taxa named by Elmer Drew Merrill